Pleasant Hill is an unincorporated community in Saline County, Nebraska, United States. The community is southwest of Crete and lies between Turkey Creek to the north and Spring Creek to the south.

History
Pleasant Hill had a post office from 1869 until 1912. It was named from its setting.

References

Unincorporated communities in Saline County, Nebraska
Unincorporated communities in Nebraska